Trhovište is a village and municipality in Michalovce District in the Kosice Region of eastern Slovakia.

History
In historical records the village was first mentioned in 1220 as 'Vasarhel'.

Geography
The village lies at an elevation of 130 metres (425 ft) and covers an area of 12.562 km² (4.850 mi²). The municipality has a population of about 1825 people.

Government
The village has its own birth registry and police force.

Economy
The village has a petrol station and an insurance company.

Culture
The village has a public library, gymnasium, and a football pitch.

See also
 List of municipalities and towns in Michalovce District
 List of municipalities and towns in Slovakia

External links

http://www.statistics.sk/mosmis/eng/run.html

Villages and municipalities in Michalovce District